Bušletić is a village in the municipality of Doboj, Bosnia and Herzegovina. The village has both agriculture and industry.

References

Villages in Republika Srpska
Populated places in Doboj